Tonsoku-like, DNA repair protein is a protein that in humans is encoded by the TONSL gene.

Function 

The protein encoded by this gene is thought to be a negative regulator of NF-kappa-B mediated transcription. The encoded protein may bind NF-kappa-B complexes and trap them in the cytoplasm, preventing them from entering the nucleus and interacting with the DNA. Phosphorylation of this protein targets it for degradation by the ubiquitination pathway, which frees the NF-kappa-B complexes to enter the nucleus.

References

Further reading 

 
 
 
 
 
 
 
 

Genes
Human proteins